Action Against Hunger is a global humanitarian organization which originated in France and is committed to ending world hunger. The organization helps malnourished children and provides communities with access to safe water and sustainable solutions to hunger.

In 2020, Action Against Hunger worked in 51 countries around the world with more than 8,300 employees and volunteers helping 13.6 million people in need.

Action Against Hunger was established in 1979 by a group of French doctors, scientists, and writers. Nobel Prize-winning physicist Alfred Kastler served as the organization's first chairman. Currently, Mumbai-based businessman and philanthropist Ashwini Kakkar serves as International President of Action Against Hunger network. 

The group initially provided assistance to Afghan refugees in Pakistan, famine-stricken Ugandan communities, and Cambodian refugees in Thailand. It expanded to address additional humanitarian concerns in Africa, the Middle East, Southeast Asia, the Balkans, and elsewhere during the 1980s and 1990s. Action Against Hunger's Scientific Committee pioneered the therapeutic milk formula (F100), now used by all major humanitarian aid organizations to treat acute malnutrition. Early results showed that treatment with F100 has the capacity to reduce the mortality rate of severely malnourished children to below 5%, with a median hospital fatality rate quoted of 23.5% A few years later, the therapeutic milk was repackaged as ready-to-use therapeutic foods (RUTFs), a peanut-based paste packaged like a power bar. These bars allow for the treatment of malnutrition at home and do not require any preparation or refrigeration.

The international network currently has headquarters in six countries – France, Spain, the United States, Canada, Italy, the UK. Its four main areas of work include nutrition, food security, water and sanitation, and advocacy.

The integrated approaches with various sectors of intervention are:
 Nutrition and Health
 Water, Sanitation and Hygiene
 Food Security & Livelihoods
 Emergency Response

In 2022, Action Against Hunger USA is leading a USAID-funded project to address health and nutrition challenges associated with policy, advocacy, financing, and governance in communities around the world, and will work in partnership with leading organizations such as Pathfinder International, Amref Health Africa, Global Communities, Humanity & Inclusion, Kupenda for the Children, and Results for Development.

Restaurants against hunger 
Action Against Hunger partners with leaders from the food and beverage industry to bring attention to global hunger. Each year, several campaigns are run by the network to raise funds and support the organisation's programs : Restaurants Against Hunger and Love Food Give Food.

Countries of intervention 
In 2019, Action Against Hunger International Network is present in 51 countries:

Africa 
Burkina Faso, Burundi, Cameroon, Ivory Coast, Djibouti, Ethiopia, Kenya, Liberia, Malawi, Madagascar, Mali, Mauritania, Niger, Nigeria, Uganda, Central African Republic, Democratic Republic of the Congo, Senegal, Sierra Leone, Somalia, South Soudan, Tanzania, Chad, Zimbabwe

Asia 
Bangladesh, Myanmar, Cambodia, India, Indonesia, Mongolia, Nepal, Pakistan, Philippines, South Caucasus

Caribbean 
Haïti

Europe 
Turkey, Ukraine

Middle East 
Afghanistan, Azerbaijan, Egypt, Lebanon, Syria, Palestinian Occupied Territories, Yemen, Jordan, Iraq

Latin America 
Colombia, Guatemala, Nicaragua, Paraguay, Peru

Action Against Hunger international network 
Since 1995 Action Against Hunger developed an international network to have a bigger global impact.

The Network has 6 headquarters in the world: France, Spain, the United Kingdom, the United States, Canada and Italy.

Action Against Hunger has also a West Africa Regional Office (WARO) located in Dakar, a training centre in Nairobi, and five logistic platforms (Lyon, Paris, Barcelona, Dubai, Panama).

This network increases the human and financial capacities and enables specialisation per headquarter.
 Action Against Hunger in France, Spain and the USA are the operational headquarters. They manage the interventions directly on the field. In order to maximize efficiency and coherence, these three operational headquarters work under the principle of one headquarter per country of intervention.
 Action Against Hunger UK focuses on research, monitoring and evaluation, notably with Hunger Watch. The UK headquarters also plays an intermediary role with DFID.
 Action Against Hunger Canada raises public and private funds in North America and plays an increasing role on the national level.
 Action Against Hunger / Azione contro la Fame Italia raises private funds and promotes important campaigns in order to sensitize the Italian public opinion on hunger and malnutrition.

References

Further reading
 Michelle Jurkovich. 2020. Feeding the Hungry: Advocacy and Blame in the Global Fight against Hunger. Cornell University Press.

External links
Action Against Hunger US website
Action Against Hunger UK website
Action Contre la Faim France website
Acción Contra el Hambre Spain website
Action Contre la Faim Canada website
Aktion gegen den Hunger Germany website 
Azione contro la Fame Italy website 

Development charities based in France
Hunger relief organizations
International charities
Organizations based in Paris
Organizations established in 1979